"Blame It on the Summer" is a song by Polish-born singer Basia from her 2009 album It's That Girl Again. It was written by Basia Trzetrzelewska, Danny White and Andy Ross, and produced by Danny and Basia. The singer has revealed that the lyrics are "about women getting restless during the summer". The song was the lead single from It's That Girl Again in the USA, but the second single in Europe, following "A Gift".

Track listing
Download/Streaming
 "Blame It on the Summer" – 4:28

Charts

References

External links
 The official Basia website

2009 singles
2009 songs
Basia songs
Bossa nova songs
Songs written by Basia
Songs written by Danny White (musician)